This is a list of singles that charted in the top ten of the Billboard Argentina Hot 100 chart in 2020.

Top-ten singles

Key
 – indicates single's top 10 entry was also its Hot 100 debut

2019 peaks

2021 peaks

See also
List of Billboard Argentina Hot 100 number-one singles of 2020

Notes 

Notes for re-entries

References

Argentina Hot 100 Top Ten Singles
Argentine record charts
Argentina 2020